Armistead Burwell (December 13, 1777 – March 17, 1841) of Dinwiddie County, Virginia was a planter and a colonel of the United States Army in the War of 1812.

Early life and education
Armistead Burwell, born on December 13, 1777, was the son of John and Ann Powell Burwell, who were married on December 5, 1771. He was the third of six children: Elizabeth, Anne, Armistead, Frances, Hannah, and Anna.

Family

Marriage and children
On December 13, 1800, Burwell married Mary Cole Turnbull of White Hill, near Petersburg, Virginia. Their children were:
 Robert, who was a Presbyterian minister. He operated the Burwell School in Hillsborough, North Carolina.
 John
 Anne Burwell Garland, the wife of the proslavery Hugh A. Garland, a St. Louis lawyer.
 Lewis
 Mary Cole
 Armistead Burwell of Mississippi, a Union loyalist during the American Civil War.
 Benjamin Powell
 Frances King
 Charles who died at 8 days old.
 Charles Blair 
 William Turnbell Burwell, who was killed in the Mexican War on September 8, 1847, and is buried in Mississippi.
 Nathaniel Harrison died in infancy
 Elizabeth Margaret
He was a grandfather of Armistead Burwell, a North Carolina Supreme Court Justice.

Fathered Elizabeth Keckley
One of Burwell's slaves, Agnes, and he were the parents of  Elizabeth Hobbs Keckley born about 1818 at Burwell's estate in Dinwiddie County Court House, Dinwiddie, Virginia, just south of Petersburg. Because her mother was a slave, Elizabeth was born into slavery as well. 

Agnes made clothes for 82 people, 12 members of the Burwell family and 70 slaves. She learned to read and write, which was rare for slaves. Burwell permitted Agnes to marry George Pleasant Hobbs, a literate enslaved man who lived and worked at a neighbor's house during Keckley's early childhood. Keckley learned that her father was Armistead Burwell from her mother just before she died. 

Elizabeth Keckley is best known for being the modiste and close friend to Mary Todd Lincoln, wife of Abraham Lincoln, which is detailed in her 1868 memoir Behind the Scenes: Or, Thirty Years a Slave and Four Years in the White House.

Career
Burwell enslaved over fifty people.

Death
He died at Mansfield, near Petersburg, in 1841. He is buried in Blandford Cemetery in Petersburg, Virginia.

References

External links

People from Dinwiddie County, Virginia
American planters
American slave owners
1771 births
1841 deaths
Burwell family of Virginia